Bill Smith (born 8 February 1935) was a British former Grand Prix motorcycle road racer.

Smith's specialty was on street circuits such as the Isle of Man TT, the North West 200 and the Ulster Grand Prix. His best season was in 1963 when he finished the year in 12th place in the 500cc world championship. Smith won the 350 class at the 1968 North West 200. In 1978, he won the Formula III Class in the Formula TT World Championship.

References

External links
Bill Smith Motors
Bill Smith at eggersdorfer.info 

British motorcycle racers
125cc World Championship riders
250cc World Championship riders
350cc World Championship riders
500cc World Championship riders
Isle of Man TT riders
Place of birth missing (living people)
Living people
1935 births